Johan Frederik von Marschalck (26 November 1618 – 16 March 1679) was a German-born, Norwegian government official and landowner. He served as the last Chancellor of Norway, ending a tradition that had lasted for over 400 years.

He was born in Bremervörde, capital of the Prince-Archbishopric of Bremen. He was a son of Levin von Marschalck (1585-1629), Bremian prince-archiepiscopal Landdrost (1615–1626) and chancellor of the German Chancery in Copenhagen (1628–1629). 
He first went to Denmark  when he accompanied his father in the service of King Christian IV of Denmark.  He was officially naturalized as Danish nobleman in 1652. He then moved to Norway, and was district governor in 1662-69 at Bratsberg amt and took office in 1669 as staple commander of Bergenhus. In 1674, he was elected Chancellor of Norway where his main functions were within the judiciary.

Personal life
In 1653, he was married to Margrethe Bjelke (1622-1698), daughter of Chancellor and squire Jens Ågessøn Bjelke (1580-1659) and Sophie Henriksdatter Brockenhuus (1587-1656). She was the sister of Ove Bjelke (1611-1674), Henrik Bjelke (1615-1683) and Jørgen Bjelke (1621-1696)  all of whom held prominent positions in Norway, and he does became a Norwegian nobleman. They were the parents of a number of children including Christian Frederik von Marschalck (born ca. 1650) who in 1686 became owner of the estate at Austrått (Austråttborgen) in Sør-Trøndelag, Norway.

References

1618 births
1679 deaths
People from Bremen (state)
Chancellors of Norway
Norwegian civil servants
Norwegian landowners
County governors of Norway
German emigrants to Norway